Eastern New Mexico is a physiographic subregion within the U.S. state of New Mexico. The region is sometimes called the "High Plains," or "Eastern Plains (of New Mexico)," and was historically referred to as part of the "Great American Desert". The region is largely coterminous with the portion of the Llano Estacado in New Mexico. The region is characterized by flat, largely-featureless terrain with the exception of the Pecos River valley and the abrupt breaks along the Mescalero Ridge and northern caprock escarpments of the Llano Estacado. The region typically lacks the high relief of central and northern New Mexico, such as that in the Sangre de Cristo and Sandia mountain ranges. The climate is semi-arid with hot summers and is characterized by significant wind and dust storms in the springtime.

Like much of the Llano Estacado region, Eastern New Mexico is largely rural and agricultural, and resembles West Texas in geography, economy, and demographics. Population is sparse as compared to the rest of the country. The region includes portions of the counties of Curry, De Baca, Guadalupe, Lea, Quay, and Roosevelt. It is served by Eastern New Mexico University, a state university located in Portales, and the Blackwater Draw archaeological site is located there.

Cities in Eastern New Mexico

The largest cities in Eastern New Mexico are:

Gallery

See also
Caprock Escarpment
Llano Estacado
Lucianosaurus
Mescalero Ridge
Pecos River
West Texas

External links
High Plains Historical Foundation
Public domain images of the Llano Estacado and Eastern New Mexico

 
Regions of New Mexico